The 2015 Quebec Men's Provincial Curling Championship, also known as the Quebec Tankard, was held  from January 12 to 18 at the Complexe Sportif Sani Marc in Victoriaville, Quebec. The winning team represented Quebec at the 2015 Tim Hortons Brier in Calgary, Alberta. The event was held in conjunction with the 2015 Quebec Scotties Tournament of Hearts.

Qualification

Teams

Standings

Round robin results

Draw 1
Monday, January 12, 20:00

Draw 2
Tuesday, January 13, 12:00

Draw 3Tuesday, January 13, 19:30Draw 4Wednesday, January 14, 12:00Draw 5Wednesday, January 14, 19:30Draw 6Thursday, January 15, 8:15Draw 7Thursday, January 15, 15:45Draw 8Friday, January 16, 8:15Draw 9Friday, January 16, 15:45Playoffs

1 vs. 2Saturday, January 17, 12:003 vs. 4Saturday, January 17, 12:00SemifinalSunday, January 17, 19:30FinalSunday, January 18, 14:30''

References

External links
CurlingZone Coverage

Quebec Men's Provincial Curling Championship
Curling in Quebec
Sport in Victoriaville
Quebec Men's Provincial Curling Championship